Malay local varieties is a local variety of the Malay language which is generally spoken in Peninsular Malaya, Kra Isthmus, Tanintharyi in Burma, Coastal Borneo, and Sumatra known as "Tanah Melayu" or "Alam Melayu". The local Malay variety is different from the Malay creole which was originally spoken by traders, and immigrant Malay was later spoken by the local people, whereas Malay local varieties were formed because of the Malay culture that developed in the area, not because of the combination of two different cultures.

list of languages

Debated and controversial
Debates about the Malay language and its varieties are often controversial. Sometimes in some areas in Indonesia, local culture that absorbs Malay elements is often referred to as an effort to Malayisation local culture. Like the Sakai and Kubu in the interior of the forest Riau and Jambi whose ancestors are believed to came from Pagaruyung Kingdom belonging to the Minang then migrated and because of the arrival of the Malays to the area, the people followed Malay culture and the language was also spoken.

References

Malay culture
Malay language
Malayic languages
Languages of Indonesia
Languages of Malaysia
Languages of Thailand